The 2012 Lebanese Elite Cup is the 15th edition of this football tournament in Lebanon. The competition started on 4 August. This tournament includes the six best teams from the 2011–12 Lebanese Premier League season.

Group stage

Group A

Group B

Final Stage

Semi finals

Final

Lebanese Elite Cup seasons
Elite